Andre Maurice Woolfolk (born January 26, 1980) is a former American football cornerback. He was drafted by the Tennessee Titans 28th overall in the first round of the 2003 NFL Draft. He played with the Titans from 2003–2006. He played college football at Oklahoma.

In his career, Woolfolk caught three interceptions, all thrown by David Carr.

Woolfolk had most recently been an offseason member of the New York Jets.

A native of Denver, he attended Thomas Jefferson High School, where he played for the football team and was teammates with Marcus Houston.

External links
Tennessee Titans bio

1980 births
Living people
Players of American football from Denver
African-American players of American football
American football cornerbacks
Oklahoma Sooners football players
Tennessee Titans players
New York Jets players
American football wide receivers
21st-century African-American sportspeople
20th-century African-American people